Nicolina Pernheim (born 22 August 1991) is a blind Swedish Paralympic judoka who competes in international level events. She is a triple European champion in the women's middleweight category and has participated at the Summer Paralympics three times. She is highly regarded as one of Sweden's best female judoka.

In 2020 she was supported financially by a campaign which raised money from Swedes who bought a particular pillow. The money was shared between Pernheim, cyclist Louise Jannering and long jumper Viktoria Karlsson in order that they could fund guides prior to the postponed 2020 Summer Paralympics in Tokyo.

References

1991 births
Living people
Sportspeople from Gothenburg
Paralympic judoka of Sweden
Swedish female judoka
Judoka at the 2008 Summer Paralympics
Judoka at the 2012 Summer Paralympics
Judoka at the 2016 Summer Paralympics
20th-century Swedish women
21st-century Swedish women